Juaquin James Malphurs (born May 31, 1986), known professionally as Waka Flocka Flame, is an American rapper. Signing to 1017 Brick Squad and Warner Bros. Records in 2009, he became a mainstream artist with the release of his singles "O Let's Do It", "Hard in da Paint", and "No Hands" (featuring Roscoe Dash and Wale), with the latter peaking at number 13 on the US Billboard Hot 100. His debut studio album Flockaveli was released in 2010. His second studio album Triple F Life: Friends, Fans & Family was released in 2012 and was preceded by the lead single "Round of Applause" (featuring Drake).

Early life 
Malphurs was born in South Jamaica, Queens, New York City. His family eventually settled in Riverdale, Georgia. His mother, Debra Antney, is rapper Gucci Mane's former manager and the CEO of So Icey/Mizay Entertainment. The name "Waka" was given to him by his cousin, after the Muppets character Fozzie Bear's catchphrase, "Wocka Wocka". The name "Flocka Flame" was given to him by Gucci Mane, whom he has known since he was 19.

Career

2009–2010: Flockaveli 

Waka Flocka came to fame with his breakthrough single "O Let's Do It" in 2009, which peaked at number 62 on the US Billboard Hot 100. Waka Flocka is a member of 1017 Brick Squad with Gucci Mane, OJ Da Juiceman, Frenchie, and Wooh Da Kid. On January 19, 2010, Malphurs was shot and robbed at a car wash in Atlanta. The bullet went through his right arm. His debut album, Flockaveli, was released on October 1, 2010. The album debuted at number six on the US Billboard 200. The album was inspired by Tupac Shakur, whose final stage name and pseudonym before his death was Makaveli.  He was named the eighth hottest MC of 2010 by MTV.

Gucci Mane fired Waka Flocka's mother as his manager. There was initially no animosity between the two rappers due to this event. In an MTV interview, both he and Waka Flocka affirmed that their relationship was, at the time, in good standing even though they no longer spoke to one another. In early September, Gucci Mane was seen at Flocka's Flockaveli listening party supporting the artist.

2011–2012: Ferrari Boyz and Triple F Life: Friends, Fans & Family 
In 2011, Waka Flocka posed for a nude but not revealing picture for PETA, to boycott killing animals and wearing fur. The picture says "ink not mink". Waka Flocka released several mixtapes in 2011, including Salute Me or Shoot Me 3, Benjamin Flocka and his last Twin Towers 2 (No Fly Zone) with fellow rapper Slim Dunkin. On August 9, 2011, his collaborative album with Gucci Mane, titled Ferrari Boyz, was released. The first single was "She Be Puttin On", featuring the now deceased Slim Dunkin, who was shot at an Atlanta recording studio while shooting a music video.

"Round of Applause", featuring Canadian rapper Drake, was released on October 14, 2011 as the first single from his second studio album, Triple F Life: Friends, Fans & Family. It was produced by frequent collaborator, Lex Luger. The album itself was released on June 8, 2012.

2013–present: Flockaveli 2 

On January 22, 2013, Waka Flocka announced that he had completed his third studio album, titled Flockaveli 2, featuring guest appearances by Timbaland and Wyclef Jean. On May 21, 2013, he gave a release date of October 5, 2013; in June he gave a new date of January 2014. In July 2014 he named producers on the album; in November the front cover art was released. In January 2020 he announced that he'd release his last album that year; Flockaveli 2 was not released in 2020.

In February 2013 he released DuFlocka Rant 2, a mixtape with guest appearances by Gucci Mane, Lil Wayne, French Montana, Ace Hood and Young Scooter. A sequel followed in May, DuFlocka Rant: Halftime Show, featuring fellow Southern rapper T.I. In October he released a third mixtape, From Roaches to Rollies.

In 2014 he released two mixtaps, Re-Up in March and I Can't Rap Vol. 1 in July. Also in July he announced a new EDM album, Turn Up God, to be released later in the year; it wasn't.

In 2014, Waka Flocka appeared in the third season of the VH1 show Love & Hip Hop: Atlanta. The show loosely follows events in the life of Waka Flocka and his wife, Tammy Rivera.

On March 2, 2015, Waka Flocka released a collaboration mixtape with DJ Whoo Kid entitled The Turn Up Godz Tour, with guest appearances from Future, Howard Stern, Machine Gun Kelly, Offset, Cash Out, Bobby V, Gucci Mane, Tony Yayo, and Watch The Duck. On April 1, 2015, Waka Flocka released the mixtape Salute Me Or Shoot Me 5, with guest appearances from Future, Yo Gotti and Juvenile. Waka Flock released another mixtape, titled Flockaveli 1.5, on November 25, 2015.

In April 2015 Waka Flocka did a collaboration campaign with Rolling Stone magazine in which he pretended to run for president.  Although he was 7 years too young to be considered president, the campaign, directed by Sam Lipman Stern of Live from the Streets, went viral and was picked up by dozens of media outlets such as CNN, La Times, Washington Post and many more.

Legal issues 
On January 3, 2011, Waka Flocka turned himself in to authorities in Atlanta following a previous raid on his home. He was booked on possession of marijuana, hydrocodone, possession of a firearm by a convicted felon, and violation of probation for driving on a suspended license. On January 5, 2011, he was released after posting bail.

On October 10, 2014, Waka Flocka was arrested at Hartsfield-Jackson Atlanta International Airport when a security scan turned up a loaded handgun in his luggage. He was released two hours later.

Controversy 
On March 15, 2013, Gucci Mane announced that frequent collaborator and close friend Waka Flocka Flame was "dropped" from 1017 Brick Squad Records. The two rappers proceeded to throw insults back and forth on Twitter. Though it was reported that Gucci's Twitter account was hacked, Waka stated, "Dont let da media fool u. This shit real Shawty." On March 27, 2013, during an MTV Jams interview with Sway Calloway, Waka explained that he would never do music nor business with Gucci ever again. Neither of the rappers have explained where the controversy originated from. Waka has stated, "I guess we both be at the finish line we just going our own routes. That's all I can say. What's the reason? Sometimes it's none of your fuckin' business what's the reason. Just understand two men went they own ways but it's no problem." In October 2013, Waka Flocka released a diss track towards Gucci Mane titled "Ice Cream".

On November 19, 2013, it was revealed Gucci Mane had filed a lawsuit against Waka Flocka Flame, Waka's mother Debra Antney, OJ Da Juiceman, rapper Khia Stone and producer Zaytoven. The lawsuit accuses the parties of fraud, racketeering, and breach of contract. According to Gucci Mane, Waka's mother Antney took control of his 1017 Brick Squad Records, LLC., without permission, and used it to create three separate offshoot labels. Gucci also accused the parties in the lawsuit of withholding royalties and inflating the cost of label expenditures. In his lawsuit, Gucci Mane also says that Antney took more than the typical 20 percent management fee. Gucci Mane also alleges that Antney's actions led to his having money and tax problems.

Waka Flocka Flame would post a tweet on September 20, 2014, to his verified Twitter account that included an old picture of himself and Gucci Mane with the caption "… #NoBeef ", confirming that the two had buried the hatchet.

In a February 2017 BBC Radio interview, Waka Flocka addressed his relationship with Gucci Mane, questioning his former mentor's street credibility and nixing the possibility of a Brick Squad reunion. Several days later, Waka released "Was My Dawg", a diss track aimed at Gucci Mane, with cover art featuring the other rapper's silhouette.

Other ventures

Presidential campaign 
In April 2015, Malphurs announced that he was running for president, despite the fact he was below the constitutionally required age of 35, as he was only 30 by the time of the 2016 United States presidential election. His platform included legalizing marijuana, raising the minimum hourly wage to $15, and creating better trade opportunities for school students. His other proposals included banning dogs from restaurants and making it illegal for people with shoe sizes above 13 to walk on the street. He also seemed to be dismissive of Congress, and had an anti-war stance. Former professional wrestler Ric Flair was his running mate.

Personal life 

Waka Flocka is of African American, Native American, European (including Italian) and Dominican descent.

In December 2013, Waka Flocka's younger brother and fellow rapper KayO Redd committed suicide at his home in Henry County, Georgia. On January 24, 2014, during an interview, Waka Flocka spoke on his brother's passing:

On May 25, 2014, Waka Flocka married Tammy Rivera.

Waka Flocka is a passionate supporter of Atlanta United FC, regularly attending games in Atlanta, traveling to away games, and serving as a team ambassador.

On October 3, 2020, Waka Flocka received an honorary doctorate in philanthropy and humanitarianism from the Bible Institute of America Theological Seminary, credited to his charity and mental health advocacy.

Discography 

Flockaveli (2010)
Ferrari Boyz (with Gucci Mane) (2011)
Triple F Life: Friends, Fans & Family (2012)

Filmography

Awards and nominations

See also 
 List of animal rights advocates

References

External links 

 
 

1986 births
Living people
1017 Brick Squad artists
African-American male rappers
American rappers of Dominican Republic descent
American people of Italian descent
American people who self-identify as being of Native American descent
American shooting survivors
Atlantic Records artists
Gangsta rappers
People from Queens, New York
People from Riverdale, Georgia
Rappers from Atlanta
Rappers from Georgia (U.S. state)
Rappers from New York City
Southern hip hop musicians
Warner Records artists
Participants in American reality television series
21st-century American rappers
21st-century American male musicians
Candidates in the 2016 United States presidential election
21st-century African-American politicians
21st-century American politicians
20th-century African-American people
Trap musicians